La Porte (French for "The Door") is a city in LaPorte County, Indiana, United States, of which it is the county seat. Its population was estimated to be 21,341 in 2022. It is one of the two principal cities of the Michigan City-La Porte, Indiana Metropolitan Statistical Area, which is included in the Chicago–Naperville–Michigan City, Illinois–Indiana–Wisconsin Combined Statistical Area.

La Porte is located in northwest Indiana, east of Gary, and west of South Bend. It was first settled by European Americans in 1832.
The city is twinned with Grangemouth in Scotland.

History
The settlement of La Porte was established in July 1832. Abraham P. Andrew, one of the purchasers of the site, constructed the first sawmill in that year.  The first settler arrived in October, building a permanent cabin just north of what would become the courthouse square.

After the US extinguished land claims by the Potowatomi and other historic tribes of the area by treaty and removal to Indian Territory, in 1833 a Federal Land Office was established in La Porte.  People would come to this office from newly established surrounding counties to buy land from the government, including Solon Robinson, founder of Crown Point.  The office was moved to Winamac in 1839.

By 1835 the settlement had grown to the extent that La Porte was incorporated as a town.  A newspaper was established in 1836. La Porte Medical School, the first of its kind in the Midwest, was founded in 1842.  An alumnus of school, William Worrall Mayo, established what became the famed Mayo Clinic in Minnesota in 1889.

By 1852 La Porte had become a well-established settlement of considerable size for its time and vicinity, with 5,000 residents.  In that same year it was granted a city charter by the Indiana General Assembly, and the first mayor was elected.  La Porte continued to grow, attracting numerous diverse industries, the largest of which became the Advance-Rumely company.  Advance-Rumely developed and manufactured the Oil-Pull tractor engine, considered to have played a pivotal role in the agricultural development of the Great Plains.  By 1869, Advance-Rumely was the largest employer in La Porte.

During the 1850s numerous maple trees were planted along Indiana and Michigan avenues in the city by local resident Sebastian Lay.  Subsequently, La Porte became known as the "Maple City".  Today, Indiana and Michigan Avenues comprise a historic district in the city, containing many homes and other structures of architectural and historical interest.  Between 1892 and 1894, the third and current LaPorte county courthouse was erected at a cost of $300,000.  The structure is built of red sandstone from Lake Superior, shipped via boat to Michigan City and then by rail to La Porte.  The courthouse is considered to be one of La Porte's best known structures.  In 2007 the exterior of the building was extensively restored at a cost of $2.9 million.

Historic sites districts
Downtown LaPorte Historic District
Francis H. Morrison House
Indiana and Michigan Avenues Historic District
Marion Ridgeway Polygonal Barn

Geography
La Porte is located at  (41.609057, −86.717567).

U.S. 35 passes through La Porte.

La Porte is accessible from Chicago by the South Shore train line which begins at Millennium Station and ends in Michigan City, Indiana. With multiple stops in between including Chesterton and Hudson Lake, Indiana. Which are both only a short drive from La Porte.

La Porte is also accessible by Automobile.

Demographics

2010 census
As of the census of 2010, there were 22,053 people, 8,962 households, and 5,362 families residing in the city. The racial makeup of the city was 28.6% White, 13.0% African American, 0.3% Native American, 0.5% Asian, 4.9% from other races, and 2.6% from two or more races. Hispanic or Latino of any race were 61.2% of the population.

There were 8,962 households, of which 31.6% had children under the age of 18 living with them, 39.2% were married couples living together, 14.9% had a female householder with no husband present, 5.8% had a male householder with no wife present, and 40.2% were non-families. 33.0% of all households were made up of individuals, and 14.6% had someone living alone who was 65 years of age or older. The average household size was 2.39 and the average family size was 3.04.

The median age in the city was 36.2 years. 24.5% of residents were under the age of 18; 9.5% were between the ages of 18 and 24; 26.7% were from 25 to 44; 24.2% were from 45 to 64; and 15.3% were 65 years of age or older. The gender makeup of the city was 48.2% male and 51.8% female.

2000 census
As of the census of 2000, there were 21,621 people, 8,916 households, and 5,545 families residing in the city. The racial makeup of the city was 92.60% White, 1.92% African American, 0.37% Native American, 0.38% Asian, 3.39% from other races, and 1.33% from two or more races. Hispanic or Latino of any race were 6.52% of the population.

There were 8,916 households, out of which 29.8% had children under the age of 18 living with them, 45.4% were married couples living together, 12.3% had a female householder with no husband present, and 37.8% were non-families. 31.9% of all households were made up of individuals, and 14.4% had someone living alone who was 65 years of age or older. The average household size was 2.36 and the average family size was 2.98.

In the city, the population was spread out, with 24.5% under the age of 18, 9.6% from 18 to 24, 29.1% from 25 to 44, 20.3% from 45 to 64, and 16.7% who were 65 years of age or older. The median age was 36 years. For every 100 females, there were 93.5 males. For every 100 females age 18 and over, there were 90.1 males.

The median income for a household in the city was $35,376, and the median income for a family was $45,784. Males had a median income of $32,319 versus $22,756 for females. The per capita income for the city was $17,900. About 7.7% of families and 11.0% of the population were below the poverty line, including 13.2% of those under age 18 and 13.1% of those age 65 or over.

Government

The government consists of a mayor and a city council. The mayor is elected in citywide vote. The city council consists of seven members. Five are elected from individual districts. Two are elected at-large.

Education
The La Porte Community School Corporation serves approximately 6,500 students.

Primary and secondary education
Public schools
La Porte Community Schools'La Porte High School
La Porte Middle School
La Porte Intermediate School
Crichfield Elementary
Hailmann Elementary
Handley Elementary
Indian Trail Elementary
Kingsbury Elementary
Kingsford Heights Elementary
Lincoln Elementary
Riley Elementary
South LaPorte County Special Education Cooperative
Private schools
La Lumiere School (9–12)
Saint John Lutheran School (K–8)
St. Joseph's School (PK–5) – closed June, 2012
Door Prairie Adventist Christian School (PK–8)
Renaissance Academy (PK–8)

With eight state baseball titles, La Porte High School holds the distinction of winning the greatest number in Indiana.

Public library
The city has a public library, a branch of the La Porte County Public Library.

Features
The famous Advance-Rumely tractor company was established in La Porte where it developed steam engines and eponymous green kerosene tractors.

La Porte has been featured in an occasional movie, including Prancer (1989), A Piece of Eden (2000), Treadmill (2006), Providence (2009) and Woman's Prison (2009).

La Porte was once the home of the world-famous Parsons Horological Institute, founded in the 1890s and still extant as part of Bradley University in Peoria, Illinois.

La Porte was the eastern terminus of the Chicago – New York Electric Air Line Railroad, an ambitious early high-speed rail project.

Author J. K. Rowling has a Portkey (Key to the City) for La Porte. It was presented to her by Emerson Spartz.
Places of interest
 La Porte Little Theatre Club, founded in 1925 is one of the oldest and longest running live community theatre groups in the country.
 LaPorte County Historical Society which features several historic displays including the Kesling Automobile Collection which consists of more than 30 vintage and rare automobiles.
 The Indiana and Michigan Avenues Historic District, Downtown LaPorte Historic District, Francis H. Morrison House, and Marion Ridgeway Polygonal Barn are listed in the National Register of Historic Places.

Parks and recreation
La Porte has an extensive city park district.

Allesee Park, (Boyd Boulevard) – is a 6-acre neighborhood park on the south side of the city. It was developed adjacent to a housing subdivision to provide recreational facilities to the neighborhood. The Park was named after George Allesee Sr (18989-1968). The City of La Porte designated the land to be a park and named it after George shortly after his passing. George Allesee was the long time Physical Director of the La Porte YMCA, He also broadcast La Porte Slicers Games on the Radio for 50 years, was the PA Announcer for Sunday Baseball at FOX Park, and for Parochial Football at Kiwanis Field in La Porte. George Allesee Coached many Baseball, Basketball, and Volleyball teams for the YMCA that won state championships. George was the founder of the La Porte Old Timers Baseball association and The La Porte Baseball Hall of Fame. He also played Minor League Baseball after playing High School Football, Basketball, and Baseball. His oldest son also named George was also a well known La Portean as a Sub Teacher for many years after being a History Teacher. His youngest son Tom Allesee played college basketball for the Indiana Hoosiers. The park includes a baseball diamond, basketball half-court, benches, parking, playground, and a walking track. Improvements were made in 2000 thanks to a donation by Richard Allesee (one of his sons) to the La Porte Park Foundation.
Ben Rees Park, (Scott Street) – is a 1.5-acre parcel that is half of a square block located near the Civic Auditorium. The park was the site of the Fourth Ward School in the early 1900s. The school was demolished in the 1920s and the property was donated to the city in the 1940s. The park was named in honor of Ben C. Rees, a local attorney and school board member. A new playground, basketball court and gazebo shelter were installed through the help of community volunteers and contributions.
Bill Reed Tennis Complex (2150 A Street) – features several tennis courts, parking, water fountains and a pavilion.
Charles W. Lindewald Park, (Park Street) –  is considered La Porte's first park. A parcel of land, 9.4 acres on Lower Lake, was purchased in 1890. The original parcel contained a notable grove of white oaks, of which a few stands of this native timber still remains. The park today is a popular site for family reunions and picnics. Facilities include a picnic shelter with grills, playground, restrooms, water fountains, ball diamond, basketball half-court and 12 lighted horseshoe pits, which are home to the La Porte Horseshoe Pitches Association.
Clarke Field, (Farrand Avenue) – is a two square block area of 6 acres that was a donation to the city in the late 1930s. The park is generally surrounded with tall, mature fir evergreen trees that provide a buffer for the adjacent residential areas. The main recreational usage at Clarke Field are two ball diamonds, one used primarily by the La Porte High School junior varsity and La Porte Babe Ruth Baseball and the other for younger age levels. The park also contains a playground, ball diamonds, a concession stand, water fountains, and public restrooms.
Fox Memorial Park, (Truesdale Avenue) – originally started in 1911 with only 15 acres, has grown today to 170 acres of scenic beauty. In the early 1900s, flowers, shrubs, and trees were planted to further beautify the hills of mature oak, hawthorn and wild apple. The entire park was landscaped and strolling paths developed. Fox Memorial Park includes Clear Lake, which encompasses approximately 100 acres of the total park. Today, Fox Memorial Park can be considered one of La Porte's finest parks. It still contains much of its scenic beauty. The trees planted in the early 1900s have matured to provide a scenic environment. Active recreational facilities have been developed at the park as the demand for such activities have increased. The park offers ball diamonds, including Ron Reed Field; basketball; playgrounds; picnic shelters with grills; fishing; boating; water fountains; walking and fitness trials; and Thrills ‘n’ Spills Skate Park. The park also contains the Dennis F. Smith Amphitheatre, home to various special events including the Arts in the Park program.
Hastings Park (Monroe St.) – is a small park, featuring a playground and benches.
Kesling Park (2150 A Street) – is located on the southern edge of the community. It started with a small 2-acre land donation and has since grown through additional donations by the Kesling family to the present day size of 90 acres. Today, residents from all of La Porte enjoy the modern facilities including four ball diamonds, six tennis courts, a walking and nature trail, soccer fields, basketball courts, sledding hill and picnic shelters. The park also contains Fort La Play Porte, a large community-built playground.
Koomler Park (Miller Street) – covers 4 acres in southern La Porte. It was initially a play area developed by the federal government in the 1940s for children of the workers at the Kingsbury Ordinance Plant. In 1962, this land was transferred to the city for exclusive use as a park. Today, Koomler Park serves the residents of Maple Terrace and offers a ball diamond, basketball court and playground.
LaPark (1st Street) – is adjacent to Bethany Lutheran Church.
Rumley Park (Home Street) is a 4-acre neighborhood park that was purchased and developed entirely with federal funds in 1980. It was actually a replacement park for the former Marquette Park, which was located four blocks away. Marquette Park was a piece of donated land that was unsuitable and unbuildable for a park. Rumley Park offers a basketball court, playground, picnic facilities and fishing.
Scott Field (Jefferson Avenue) – was the result of another land donation of a developer. Originally, in the layout of Scott's Second Addition, 5 acres in the middle of the new housing development was left as a neighborhood play area. The land was donated to the City of La Porte in 1923. It was not until 1952 that the Park Department entered a 99-year lease, for $1 per year, with the school corporation. The park currently includes a shelter, playground, ball diamond, open play, half-court basketball and picnic facilities.
Soldiers Memorial Park (250 Pine Lake Ave.) – was dedicated in 1928 and contains 556 acres. It is the largest city park and widely known for its forested beauty, water sports and organized recreational activities. The park encompasses all of Stone Lake, 140 acres of water and all but 628 feet of shoreline. Also the park provides a variety of active and passive recreational activities including swimming, playgrounds, diamond sports (softball, baseball and t-ball), volleyball, mountain biking, cross-country skiing, fishing and boating. Within its gently rolling terrain, the property is approximately 85 percent woodlands and water. Access is available to Stone Lake, Pine Lake, Crane Lake and Craven Pond. Nature trails have been developed through a stand of native trees, allowing environmental education opportunities. Soldiers Memorial Park is also the site of the Park Department Office and maintenance facilities, as well as Cummings Lodge.
Stone Lake Beach (300 Grangemouth Drive) – is a public beach with a volleyball courts, playground, picnic shelter, concession stand, and public restrooms.
Warsaw Tot Lot (Warsaw Street) – is a small playground of less than 1 acre in size. The triangular piece of land was donated to the city in 1946 and was developed in 1980 with funding from a federal grant. The play equipment has been recently updated thanks to a donation from the La Porte Park Foundation. Park also has a basketball half-court.
Pine Lake Beach (Pine Lake Avenue) – is a public beach with picnic tables, a newly built walk-way across the beach, and a picnic shelter including a grill.
Ski-Beach (Waverly Road) – is a public beach with picnic tables and grills. This beach is commonly used by boaters, and has a channel connecting Pine Lake to Stone Lake.

Lakes
Clear Lake
Crane Lake
Fish Trap Lake
Horseshoe Lake
Lily Lake
Lower Lake
Orr Lake
Pine Lake
Stone Lake

Golf
Legacy Hills Golf Club
 Beechwood Golf Course
Briar Leaf Golf Club

Public Activities
Fitness Fridays
Saturdays in the Sun
Saturday Farmers Market
TacoFest
Cruise Night
LakeFest

Media

FilmPrancer (1989) and A Piece of Eden (2000) were filmed on location in La Porte.

PrintLaPorte Herald-Argus is the only newspaper serving the City of La Porte. This media has since been combined with "The News Dispatch" to form "The Herald Dispatch".

Broadcast
La Porte receives television broadcasts and other radio broadcasts from Chicago and South Bend.

Radio
WCOE, 96.7 FM, WLOI, 1540 AM and Rock, 106.5 FM

In the 1990s WCOE was a broadcast home to the area NBA Team Chicago Bulls.  They broadcast Championship Bulls teams.

Notable people
 Dick Alban – former National Football League defensive back and Pro-Bowler
 Abram Andrew – United States Representative from Massachusetts
 Chuck Baldwin – Baptist minister and 2008 Presidential nominee of the Constitution Party
 Chris Bootcheck – Major League Baseball pitcher for the Los Angeles Angels of Anaheim
 Anne E. Carpenter – American scientist and the co-creator of CellProfiler
 John C. Chapple – Wisconsin legislator and newspaper editor
 Dorothy Christ – All-American Girls Professional Baseball League player
 Art Cross – former race car driver; first Rookie of the Year at the Indianapolis 500
 Brian Ebersole – Mixed martial arts veteran; UFC welterweight division fighter
 Daniel Edwards – figurative sculptor and artist
 Charlie O. Finley – owner of the Kansas City and Oakland Athletics 1960–80
 Belle Gunness – serial killer active from 1884 to 1908
 John D. Hancock – stage and film director, producer and writer
 Harold Handley – 40th Governor of Indiana, served from 1957 to 1961
 Hazel Harrison – pianist, known as the premiere black pianist of her time
 Royal R. Ingersoll – U.S. Navy rear admiral
 Paul Rowland Julian – meteorologist who with Roland A. Madden discovered the atmospheric phenomena known as the Madden–Julian oscillation 
 Peter Kesling – orthodontist known for the development of the tip-edge orthodontic appliance
 Karl Paul Link – biochemist best known for his discovery of the anticoagulant warfarin
 William Worrall Mayo – founder of the Mayo Clinic
 Henrietta Meeteer – Latin and Greek professor and dean at Swarthmore College
 Alvera Mickelsen – writer and advocate of Christian feminism
 Douglas J. Moo – New Testament scholar
 Patrick Neary – Roman Catholic Priest and Bishop
 Isamu Noguchi – Japanese-American artist and landscape architect
 Tom Nowatzke – former National Football League running back
 Tony Raines – NASCAR driver
 Ron Reed – Major League Baseball pitcher, an All-Star and World Series champion
 John G. Roberts – current Chief Justice of the United States
 William Scholl – founder of Dr. Scholl's
 Scott Skiles – National Basketball Association head coach for Milwaukee Bucks, Phoenix Suns, Chicago Bulls and Orlando Magic
 Emerson Spartz – founder of MuggleNet, a Harry Potter fan website, and GivesMeHope
 Wilbur F. Storey – newspaper publisher, Detroit Free Press and Chicago Times Almon Brown Strowger – inventor of an electro-mechanical telephone exchange which became the Strowger switch
 Miles Taylor (security expert)
 Julius Travis – Justice of the Indiana Supreme Court
 Dorothy Tristan – actress and screenwriter
 David Willis – web cartoonist known for It's Walky!, Shortpacked! and Dumbing of Age''

See also

References

External links
 
 
 
 Greater La Porte Chamber of Commerce
 The LaPorte County Herald-Argus website
 What's New La Porte? Community Stories website
 The LaPorte County Public Library
 The Internet Movie Database – Titles with locations including La Porte, Indiana, USA
  La Porte, Indiana: A Documentary Film

Cities in LaPorte County, Indiana
Northwest Indiana
County seats in Indiana
Cities in Indiana
Populated places established in 1832
1832 establishments in Indiana